Kamal Muara Stadium is a multi-use stadium in Jakarta, Indonesia.  It is currently used mostly for football. The stadium has a capacity of 10,000 spectators.

External links
Stadium information

Sports venues in Indonesia
Multi-purpose stadiums in Indonesia
Football venues in Indonesia
Athletics (track and field) venues in Indonesia
Football venues in Jakarta
Athletics (track and field) venues in Jakarta
Sports venues in Jakarta